Canadian singer and songwriter Kiesza has released three studio albums, four extended plays, thirty-four singles (including nine as a featured artist), and seven music videos.

Studio albums

Extended plays

Singles

As lead artist

As featured artist

Guest appearances

Writer credits

Music videos

Notes

References

External links 
 
 
 
 

Discographies of Canadian artists
Pop music discographies